Columbia River-Revelstoke is a provincial electoral district for the Legislative Assembly of British Columbia, Canada.

Geography 
As of the 2020 provincial election, Columbia River-Revelstoke comprises the eastern portion of the Columbia-Shuswap Regional District and the northern portion of the Regional District of East Kootenay. It is located in southeastern British Columbia and is bordered by Alberta to the east. Communities in the electoral district consist of Kimberley, Revelstoke, Golden, Invermere, Canal Flats, and Radium Hot Springs.

History 
The riding was created for the 1991 election from Columbia River and part of Shuswap-Revelstoke.

Member of Legislative Assembly 
Its MLA is Doug Clovechok, former Campus Manager of the College of the Rockies in Invermere and former Calgary schoolteacher. He was first elected in 2017. He represents the British Columbia Liberal Party.

Election results 

|-

|- style="background:white;"
! style="text-align:right;" colspan="3"|Total Valid Votes
!align="right"|13,419
!align="right"|100%
|- style="background:white;"
! style="text-align:right;" colspan="3"|Total Rejected Ballots
!align="right"|101
!align="right"|0.75%
|- style="background:white;"
! style="text-align:right;" colspan="3"|Turnout
!align="right"|13,520
!align="right"|56.17%%
|}

|-
 
|NDP
|Norm Macdonald
|align="right"|7,460
|align="right"|51.71%
|align="right"|
|align="right"|$38,430

|-

|- style="background:white;"
! style="text-align:right;" colspan="3"|Total Valid Votes
!align="right"|14,427
!align="right"|100
|- style="background:white;"
! style="text-align:right;" colspan="3"|Total Rejected Ballots
!align="right"|104
!align="right"|0.72
|- style="background:white;"
! style="text-align:right;" colspan="3"|Turnout
!align="right"|14,531
!align="right"|62.47
|}

Result: NDP gain from BC Liberal

|-

|-
 
|NDP
|Jim Doyle
|align="right"|4,551
|align="right"|31.46%
|align="right"|
|align="right"|$26,852

|}

Result: BC Liberal gain from NDP

|-
 
|NDP
|Jim Doyle
|align="right"|6,264
|align="right"|42.52%
|align="right"|
|align="right"|$30,948

|-

|Natural Law
|Sonia Stairs
|align="right"|58
|align="right"|0.39%
|align="right"|
|align="right"|$100

|}

|-
 
|NDP
|Jim Doyle
|align="right"|6,241
|align="right"|45.08%
|align="right"|
|align="right"|$28,972

|-

|}

References

External links 
BC Stats Profile - 2001
Results of 2001 election (pdf)
2001 Expenditures (pdf)
Results of 1996 election
1996 Expenditures (pdf)
Results of 1991 election
1991 Expenditures
Website of the Legislative Assembly of British Columbia

British Columbia provincial electoral districts
Revelstoke, British Columbia